Lorenzo Montipò (born 20 February 1996) is an Italian professional footballer who plays as a goalkeeper for Serie A club Hellas Verona.

Club career 
Born in Novara, Piedmont, Montipò started his professional career at hometown club Novara.

On 14 July 2015, he was signed by Siena on loan.

On 31 August 2016, Montipò was signed by Carpi in a temporary deal, with an option to purchase him outright. However, the loan was cancelled in January 2017.

On 12 July 2018, Montipò signed with Benevento on loan until 30 June 2019. On 18 June 2019, it was confirmed that Montipò had signed a four-year contract with the club.

Following Benevento's relegation from Serie A at the end of the 2020–21 season, Montipò joined Hellas Verona on loan for the 2021–22 season with a conditional obligation to buy.

International career 
On 4 September 2017, he made his debut with the Italy U21 team in a friendly match against Slovenia.

Career statistics

References 

1996 births
People from Novara
Footballers from Piedmont
Living people
Italian footballers
Italy youth international footballers
Italy under-21 international footballers
Association football goalkeepers
Novara F.C. players
A.C.N. Siena 1904 players
A.C. Carpi players
Benevento Calcio players
Hellas Verona F.C. players
Serie A players
Serie B players
Serie C players
Sportspeople from the Province of Novara